Nicolás Díaz may refer to:
 Nicolás Díaz (politician)
 Nicolás Díaz (footballer)